Antigenes  was a Greek historian, who probably lived in the late fourth century BC. He seems to have written a historical work about Alexander the Great.

Antigenes is – as well as Cleitarchus and Onesicritus – one of the older historians of Alexander mentioned by Plutarch, who described the allegedly interview of Thalestris, queen of the Amazons, with the Macedonian king as a true fact. He is also mentioned by the ancient grammarian Aelius Herodianus. The work of Antigenes has completely disappeared, but seems to have had a topographical and scientific character. It cannot be ascertained, if he is identical with Antigenes, a general of Alexander.

Edition of the fragments 
 Felix Jacoby: Fragmente der griechischen Historiker, no. 141

Notes

References 
 Eduard Schwartz:  Anigenes 10. In: Realencyclopädie der classischen Altertumswissenschaft, vol. I.2, Stuttgart 1894, col. 2399.

4th-century BC Greek people
4th-century BC historians
Historiography of Alexander the Great